Phrynocephalus interscapularis, Lichtenstein's toadhead agama, is a species of agamid lizard found in Turkmenistan, Kazakhstan, Uzbekistan, Iran, and Afghanistan.

References

interscapularis
Reptiles described in 1856
Taxa named by Hinrich Lichtenstein
Taxa named by Eduard von Martens